Manulea japonica is a moth of the family Erebidae. It is found on the Kuril Islands (Kunashir) and in China (Beijing, Shanxi, Shaanxi, Zhejiang, Yunnan, Sichuan, Tibet), Korea and Japan. It has a wingspan of 25–30 mm.

Subspecies
Manulea japonica japonica
Manulea japonica ainonis (Matsumura, 1927) (Kunashir, Japan: Hokkaido)

References

Moths described in 1889
Lithosiina
Moths of Japan